Al-Ashrafiyya, was a Palestinian Arab village in the District of Baysan. It was depopulated during the 1947–1948 Civil War in Mandatory Palestine. It was located 4.5 km southwest of Baysan.

The village was depopulated on May 12, 1948, during Operation Gideon. The village was completely destroyed and the inhabitants fled to Jordan.

History
Just east of the village site, (at 196/208) pottery remains from the Byzantine era have been found, together with coins dating to the time of Justinian I (527–565 C.E.).

British Mandate era
In  the 1922 census of Palestine, conducted by the  Mandatory Palestine authorities, Ashrafiyet Kuzma had 29 inhabitant; 27 Muslims and 2 Christians, while   Ashrafiyet Rushdi had 7 Muslims; a total of 36 inhabitants. The 2 Christians were Roman Catholics. 

In the  1931 census  there were 4 villages named  Ashrafiyat, where Ashrafiyat Kazma had 123 Muslims and 2 Christians  in a total of 34 houses, while the three others were all Muslims; 48 in 11 houses in  Ashrafiyat Abd el Hadi, 10 in 3 houses in  Ashrafiyat Haddad, and 36 in 10 houses in  Ashrafiyat Zamriq. In total there were 219 inhabitants in a total of 58 houses.

In the 1945 statistics, the population consisted of  230 Muslims, and the land area was 6711 dunams, according to an official land and population survey.
Of this, the land ownership census the Land Ownership (Dunums) was as follows:

The use of village land in 1945: 

The population rose to 267 in 1948 with 61 houses. The Wadi al-Maddu' runs near where the village was located.

1948, aftermath
In March, 1948,  Yosef Weitz had started pressing the  Haganah to expel Arab  tenant farmers, and kibbutz leaders in the Baysan valley had demanded new settlements in their area, as "a means of freeing our land [from Arabs] and preventing the return of the  beduins who had fled to Transjordan".  On 22 April, 1948,  Haganah agreed to set up five new settlements on non-Arab land, including land in Al-Ashrafiyya.

The Palestinian inhabitants of Al-Ashrafiyya, along with those of the neighbouring village of  Farwana, fled to Jordan with the approach of the pre-state Israeli forces of the Golani Brigade during Operation Gideon on 11 May 1948.

Following the war the area was incorporated into the State of Israel and two kibbutzim were established on village land in 1948, Shluhot  and Reshafim, both east of the village site.

In 1992, it was described: "The site and the area around it are cultivated by the residents of Reshafim. A fishery also has been built on the site."

References

Bibliography

External links
Welcome To al-Ashrafiyya
al-Ashrafiyya,  Zochrot
Survey of Western Palestine, map 9:   IAA, Wikimedia commons 
 Al-Ashrafiyya  at Khalil Sakakini Cultural Center

Arab villages depopulated during the 1948 Arab–Israeli War